Jean Salumu (born 26 July 1990) is a Belgian professional basketball player for Trefl Sopot of the Polish Basketball League. He also represents the Belgian national basketball team.

In 2018, Salumu was the first Belgian ever to win the Most Valuable Player award of the Belgian domestic league.

Professional career

Belgium (2009–2018)

Salumu started his career at the highest stage with B.C. Oostende in the 2009–10 season. In 2011–12 he played for the Leuven Bears. For the 2012–13 season he signed with Oostende again. In January 2013 he extended his contract with 2 seasons. After the season, he won the Rookie of the Year/Most Promising Player award.

In May 2018, Salumu was the first ever Belgian player to be named the Belgian League MVP. He was also named to the league's All-Offensive and All-Defensive Team, while also winning the  Belgian Player of the Year award. Salumu's MVP season would be his last one with Oostende, as after the season it was announced he was leaving.

Sakarya Büyükşehir (2018)

On 18 June 2018, it was announced that Salumu had signed with Turkish club  Sakarya Büyükşehir.

Pallacanestro Varese (2018–2019) 
Salumu signed with the Pallacanestro Varese of the Lega Basket Serie A on 18 December 2018.

Pistoia Basket 2000 (2019–2020) 
On September 16, 2019, he has signed with Pistoia of the Italian Lega Basket Serie A (LBA).  Salumu averaged 13.1 points, 2.3 rebounds and 2.0 assists per game.

Rasta Vechta (2020–2021) 
On September 22, 2020, Salumu signed with Rasta Vechta of the Basketball Bundesliga.

Champagne Basket (2021–2022) 
On July 13, 2021, Salumu signed with Champagne Châlons-Reims in the Pro A.

Trefl Sopot (2022–present) 
On August 3, 2022, he has signed with Trefl Sopot of the Polish Basketball League.

International career
He represented Belgium at the EuroBasket 2015, where they lost to Greece in eighth finals with 75–54.

Honours
Telenet Oostende
Belgian Championship (5): 2012-2013, 2013-2014, 2014-2015, 2015-2016, 2016-2017
Belgian Cup (6): 2010, 2013, 2014, 2015, 2016, 2017
Individual awards:
BLB Most Promising Player: 2013

Trivia
His brother Sylvestre is a rapper, better known as Woodie Smalls.

References

1990 births
Living people
BC Oostende players
Belgian expatriate basketball people in Italy
Belgian expatriate basketball people in Turkey
Belgian men's basketball players
Belgium national basketball players
Champagne Châlons-Reims Basket players
Lega Basket Serie A players
Leuven Bears players
Pallacanestro Varese players
Sportspeople from Sint-Niklaas
Pistoia Basket 2000 players
Power forwards (basketball)
Sakarya BB players
SC Rasta Vechta players
Trefl Sopot players